True Things is a 2021 British psychological drama film directed by Harry Wootliff, starring Ruth Wilson and Tom Burke. The screenplay co-written by Wootliff and Molly Davies, was based on the 2011 novel True Things about Me by Deborah Kay Davies. The film received positive reviews from critics.

Synopsis
Kate is sleepwalking through life when a chance sexual encounter with a charismatic stranger awakens her. High on infatuation she finds herself inexplicably drawn to this mysterious man. Hoping he will provide the escape she so desperately desires, she embarks on an emotionally dangerous journey that slowly begins to consume her.

Cast
 Ruth Wilson as Kate
 Tom Burke as Blond
 Hayley Squires as Alison
 Elizabeth Rider as Mum
 Frank McCusker as Dad
 Ann Firbank as Nan
 Tom Weston-Jones as Rob

Production
Ruth Wilson and Jude Law produced the film, alongside The Bureau, BBC Films and the BFI.

Release
True Things had its World Premiere at Venice, and also screened at Toronto and The London Film Festival, where it won the IWC Shaffhausen award. Samuel Goldwyn Films acquired North American distribution rights to the film. The film was released in the United Kingdom by Picturehouse Entertainment on 1 April 2022.

Wootliff has discussed what appealed to her about the book, as well as the universality of the material for both men and women, “what I loved about it was the feeling of infatuation, of addiction to somebody... you know those relationships where you think ‘why did I ever go there?’ It's one of those.”

A sentiment articulated by critic Mark Kermode: "Anyone who has ever defined themselves through the eyes of others, or sought self-worth in unworthy romance, will recognise both the agony and ecstasy of Kate’s predicament."

Critical reception
True Things received positive reviews from critics. It holds an 81% approval rating on Rotten Tomatoes, based on 68 reviews, with an average rating of 6.6/10. The critical consensus states: "Elevated by its stars' magnetic chemistry, True Things mines complex, character-driven drama from an ill-advised romance."

The film's lack of easy solutions, in relation to the protagonist being a complex and multi-layered female character, was noticed by  Sight and Sound's Rebecca Harrison: "It feels frustrating because it’s meant to: this is what it’s like to care for this character... a film that refuses to simplify Kate’s experience or force the character to give everything of herself away." The Telegraph's Tim Robey commented on the way society pigeon holes women like Kate, "There's something affecting about her struggle to be a normal person, doing what normal people do, while independently rebelling against the drudgery required of her to fit in." Also stating the role was Ruth Wilson's "best film work to date." The Times' Kevin Mayer points to the inherent contradictons of complex and emotionally-led female characters, which is a cornerstone of Wootliff's film style, "Wootliff and Wilson create a central character who is irrational, sometimes infuriating, but always intensely sympathetic."

On it's U.S. release RogerEbert.com's Sheila O'Malley noted the film's assuredly grown-up perspective, "for those of you who miss films made by adults and for adults, films which treat things like sex and loneliness with respect and honesty, True Things isn't to be missed." The New York Times Nicolas Rapold singled out the camerawork "because it is the kind that is often described as “intimate” but rarely pulled off with such Maysles-esque aplomb." Referring to the central character of Kate, The Washington Post's Noel Murray highlighted the use of P.J. Harvey's Rid of Me, as a "simultaneously sad and thrilling assertion of her own right to exist". The Wrap's Fran Hoepfner was drawn to the depth and complexity of the story, "A relationship like the one Kate pursues with Blond isn’t fed by reason; it’s fed by something larger and stranger and endlessly unknowable."

References

External links
 
 

2021 films
British drama films
BBC Film films
2021 drama films
Samuel Goldwyn Films films
2020s English-language films
2020s British films